The Defence Housing Authority, Islamabad (DHA Islamabad)  is an affluent residential neighbourhood or a gated community located within Islamabad–Rawalpindi metropolitan area of Pakistan. The neighbourhood is divided into five parts and straddles the Punjab provincial border. This neighbourhood was primarily established for military personnel in 1992 by the Armed Forces of Pakistan Welfare Department, however, currently both civilian and military families reside there. Today, DHA, Islamabad serves as one of the twin cities' most posh residential neighbourhoods.

Subdivisions

Administration
Defence is headed by a serving brigadier of the Pakistan Army under the Welfare and Rehabilitation Directorate.

Locations

Defence Phase I 
Defence I is located within the Islamabad–Rawalpindi metropolitan area between N-5 National Highway and Bahria Town Phase VII & VIII. This subdivision on its southwest abuts Soan River. A larger area acquired by the Defense Housing Authority just southwest of Phase I is named Phase I Extension and covers a total of 16,750 Kanals (8.47 sq km).

Defence Phase II 
Located in Islamabad near the Kahuta Triangle, with N-5 National Highway on its south end and Islamabad Expressway on its North. The project was commenced in February 1994.

Defence Valley 
Launched on 18 August 2008, it is located adjacent to Defence Phase II.

Commercial zones
All phases have commercial zones.

Real estate
DHA is regarded as one of the most expensive communities in the twin cities of Islamabad and Rawalpindi. Real estate in Pakistan underwent a boom during the early and mid 2000s when Overseas Pakistanis started sending substantial amounts of their savings back home after 9/11. As of 2019, statistics reveal that an average 500 yards plot in DHA Islamabad is priced between ₨20-25 million. Pakistan's leading property portal "Zameen" reported in February 2013 that property for rent and sales in Defence have performed phenomenally well.

See also
 Defence Housing Authority, Karachi
 Defence Housing Authority

References

External links
 DHA Islamabad official website
 Habib Rafiq (Pvt.) Limited official website

Islamabad
Populated places in Islamabad Capital Territory